The Best Of is the first of four compilation albums by British band James (the second album is B-Sides Ultra).

Track listing
 "Come Home" (Flood mix) from Gold Mother (1991 Re-release)
 "Sit Down" from Gold Mother (1991 Re-release)
 "She's a Star" from Whiplash
 "Laid" from Laid
 "Waltzing Along" (single version) from Whiplash
 "Say Something" from Laid
 "Born of Frustration" from Seven
 "Tomorrow" from Whiplash
 "Destiny Calling" Previously unreleased
 "Out to Get You" from Laid
 "Runaground" Previously unreleased
 "Lose Control" from Gold Mother (1991 Re-release)
 "Sometimes" from Laid
 "How Was It for You?" from Gold Mother
 "Seven" from Seven
 "Sound" from Seven
 "Ring the Bells" from Seven
 "Hymn from a Village" from James II

A limited edition version contains a second CD of live material, recorded at Whitfield St Studios in London on 21 January 1998:

 "Runaground"
 "Ring the Bells"
 "Out to Get You"
 "Johnny Yen"
 "Lose Control"
 "Laid"
 "Sound"

Reception
"They're as stubborn (another admirable James trait) as disenfranchised mules; their audience is not growing (Whiplash sold 150,000) and they've influenced precisely nobody," observed Q's John Aizlewood, "but every track here – including new songs 'Runaground' and 'Destiny Calling, which unveil the mature James: "Tell us when our time is up/Show us how to die well/Show us how to let it all go" – bristles with inspiration."

Charts

Weekly charts

Year-end charts

Certifications

References

External links
 Press release at Mercury Records

1998 greatest hits albums
James (band) compilation albums
Mercury Records compilation albums
Fontana Records compilation albums